Massie may refer to:

In places:
 Massie Township, Warren County, Ohio

People with the surname Massie:
Massie (surname)

Other uses: 
 Massie Block, fictional Character from the Clique Series
 Massie Trial, 1932 murder trial in Hawaii

See also
 Massee, a surname
Massie Wireless Station
Massie Variety Store
Massey (disambiguation)